"Leave Em Alone" is a song by American singer Layton Greene and American rapper Lil Baby featuring American hip hop duo City Girls and American rapper PnB Rock. It was released on May 29, 2019, as the lead single from American record label Quality Control's compilation album Control the Streets, Volume 2 (2019). The song was produced by Hitmaka and Cardiak, and co-produced by Paul Cabbin and Rodney Jerkins. It samples "Can't Leave 'em Alone" by Ciara featuring 50 Cent.

Composition
In the song, Layton Greene sings about not being able to leave a man. She samples the chorus of "Can't Leave 'em Alone" and sings with her own lines, showcasing her "showcasing her soft and dainty vocals in the hook", while the featured rappers each provide a "strong delivery" on each of their verses.

Music video
The music video was released on July 15, 2019, and directed by Zain Alexander Shammas. In it, the artists meet at the fictional Quality Control University.

Charts

Weekly charts

Year-end charts

Certifications

References

2019 singles
2019 songs
Lil Baby songs
City Girls songs
PnB Rock songs
Motown singles
Songs written by Lil Baby
Songs written by Ciara
Songs written by 50 Cent
Songs written by Rodney Jerkins
Song recordings produced by Rodney Jerkins
Songs written by Hitmaka
Song recordings produced by Yung Berg
Songs written by Cardiak
Songs written by LaShawn Daniels